Elephantulus is a genus of elephant shrew in the family Macroscelididae. 
It contains the following species:
 Short-snouted elephant shrew (E. brachyrhynchus)
 Cape elephant shrew (E. edwardii)
 Dusky-footed elephant shrew (E. fuscipes)
 Dusky elephant shrew (E. fuscus)
 Bushveld elephant shrew (E. intufi)
 Eastern rock elephant shrew (E. myurus)
 Karoo rock elephant shrew (E. pilicaudus)
 Western rock elephant shrew (E. rupestris)

References

 Smit, H.A., Robinson, T.J., Watson, J. & Jansen van Vuunen, B. (2008). A New Species of Elephant-shrew (Afrotheria: Macroscelidea: Elephantulus) from South Africa. Journal of Mammalogy 89 (5): 1257–1268.

Elephant shrews
Mammal genera
Taxonomy articles created by Polbot